Pterostylis acuminata, commonly known as the sharp greenhood or pointed greenhood is a species of orchid endemic to eastern Australia. It has a rosette of leaves and a single green and white flower, leaning forward with a brown point on the end of the labellum.

Description
The dorsal sepal and petals are joined and curve forward forming a hood over the column. The tip of the hood is sharply pointed and brownish. There is a broad, bulging gap in the sinus between the lateral sepals and a large gap between the lateral sepals and petals. Flowering occurs between March and May.

Taxonomy and naming
Pterostylis acuminata was first described in 1810 by Robert Brown and the description was published in Prodromus Florae Novae Hollandiae et Insulae Van Diemen. The specific epithet (acuminata) is a Latin word meaning "sharpened" or "pointed".

Distribution and habitat
The sharp greenhood grows in coastal forest and heath in Queensland and New South Wales. There is also an isolated population in far eastern Victoria.

References

acuminata
Endemic orchids of Australia
Orchids of New South Wales
Orchids of Queensland
Orchids of Victoria (Australia)
Plants described in 1810